Penn Tech may refer to two post-secondary schools in the United States:

 Pennsylvania Institute of Technology, an independent junior college in Media and Philadelphia, Pennsylvania.
 Pennsylvania College of Technology, a college affiliated with the Pennsylvania State University located in Williamsport, Pennsylvania.

See also 
Penn State, a state-related land-grant university located in State College, Pennsylvania